India has a number of intelligence agencies, of which the best known are the Research and Analysis Wing, India’s external intelligence agency, and the Intelligence Bureau, the domestic intelligence agency, responsible for counter-intelligence, counter-terrorism and overall internal security.

National Technical Research Organisation

The National Technical Research Organisation (NTRO) is a technical intelligence agency under the National Security Advisor in the Prime Minister's Office, India. It was set up in 2004. It also includes National Institute of Cryptology Research and Development (NICRD), which is first of its kind in Asia.

Research and Analysis Wing

Research and Analysis Wing (R&AW) is the primary foreign intelligence agency of India.

Aviation Research Centre

The Aviation Research Centre (ARC) is a part of the Research and Analysis Wing (R&AW) of the Cabinet Secretariat (Special Requirements) India. The first head of the ARC was R. N. Kao, the founding chief of R&AW. Over the years the ARC has grown into a large operation and flies a large and varied fleet.
Aerial surveillance, SIGINT operations, photo reconnaissance flights (PHOTINT), monitoring of borders, imagery intelligence (IMINT) are the main functions of the Aviation Research Centre (ARC). The aircraft are fitted with state-of-the-art electronic surveillance equipment and long range cameras capable of taking pictures of targets from very high altitudes. ARC also takes the responsibility along with the IAF to transport Special Frontier Force (SFF) commandos from their trans-location at Sarsawa, 250 km north of New Delhi, though the SFF's own base is in Chakrata in Uttarakhand (UK) state.

Radio Research Centre
The Radio Research Centre (RRC) is a part of the Research and Analysis Wing (R&AW) of the Cabinet Secretariat (Special Requirements) India. The radio research centre (RRC) is a premier communication and signal intelligence agency of India. RRC’s tasks include – communication with the embassies abroad, send cyphered code to agents stationed abroad, interception fixed line and wireless communication and the department closely works with the Joint Cypher Bureau. The RRC has offices all across the country and the perform the intercepts communication and sends code.

Electronics and Technical Services

The Electronics and Technical Services (ETS) is the Electronic Intelligence (ELINT) arm of India's external intelligence agency Research and Analysis Wing (R&AW). Established in the mid 1980s under the leadership of then R&AW's chief N. F. Suntook, the organisation, it is housed in the CGO complex in New Delhi. ETS is believed to be involved in ELINT roles, not restricted but also includes jamming and spoofing - Electronic Warfare (EW). ETS also involved in Electronic Surveillance Measures (ESMs), Telemetry (TELINT), Tracking and monitoring data links, interception and monitoring of navigation signals and other ELINT and EW methods.

Intelligence Bureau

The Intelligence Bureau (IB) is India's internal intelligence agency. The Intelligence Bureau (IB) (Hindi: आसूचना ब्यूरो; IAST: āsūcanā byūro) is India's domestic internal security and counter-intelligence agency under Ministry of Home Affairs. It was founded in 1887 as Central Special Branch, and is reputed to be the oldest such organization in the world.

Joint Cipher Bureau

The Joint Cipher Bureau works closely with the IB and R&AW. It is responsible for cryptanalysis and encryption of sensitive data. The inter-services Joint Cipher Bureau has primary responsibility for cryptology and SIGINT, providing coordination and direction to the other military service organizations with a similar mission. Most current equipment providing tactical intelligence is of Russian origin, including specialized direction finding and monitoring equipment.

The Joint Cipher Bureau is also responsible for issues relating to public and private key management. Cryptographic products are export-controlled licensed items, and licenses to India are not generally available for products of key length of more than 56 bits. The domestic Indian computer industry primarily produces PCs, and PC-compatible cryptographic products have been developed and are being used commercially. More robust encryption systems are not commercially produced in India, and progress in this field has been slow due to the general unavailability of technology and know-how. Customised cryptographic products have been designed and produced by organizations in the defence sector are engaged in the implementation of cryptographic techniques, protocols and the products.

All India Radio Monitoring Service

All India Radio Monitoring Service (AIRMS) is the central monitoring service that monitors broadcasts in India as well as from all foreign broadcasts of Interest to India. AIRMS is located in Shimla. It works in liaison with R&AW and Military intelligence.

Narcotics Control Bureau

The Narcotics Control Bureau (NCB) is the chief law enforcement and intelligence agency of India responsible for fighting drug trafficking and the abuse of illegal substances.

Central Board of Indirect Taxes and Customs   

The Central Board of Indirect Taxes and Customs (CBIC) is the nodal national agency responsible for administering Customs, GST, Central Excise, Service Tax & Narcotics in India. The Customs & Central Excise department was established in the year 1855 by the then British Governor General of India, to administer customs laws in India and collection of import duties/land revenue. It is one of the oldest government departments of India.  Associated agencies	of the board are
Directorate of Revenue Intelligence,
Directorate General of GST Intelligence,
Central Economic Intelligence Bureau,
Financial Intelligence Unit (FIU- India),
Directorate General of Performance Management,
National Academy of Customs, Indirect Taxes & Narcotics (NACIN),
Directorate General of Vigilance,
Directorate General of Audit,
Directorate General of Export Promotion
Customs, Excise and Service Tax Appellate Tribunal,
Directorate General of Goods & Services Tax Intelligence
Opium & Alkaloid Department,
Economic Intelligence Council,
Enforcement Directorate,
Central Bureau of Narcotics,
Directorate General of Systems.

Serious Fraud Investigation Office
 The Serious Fraud Investigation Office (SFIO) is a statutory corporate fraud investigating agency in India. Initially, it was set up by a resolution adopted by the Government of India on 2 July 2003 and carried out investigations within the existing legal framework under section 235 to 247 of the erstwhile Companies Act, 1956. Later, Section 211 of the Companies Act, 2013, accorded the statutory status to the Serious Fraud Investigation Office (SFIO).

Central Bureau of Investigation
Central Bureau of Investigation is the federal agency of India which investigate all the crime and high profile matter which relates to national security matter.

Defence Intelligence Agency

This agency was established on 5 March 2002 with the appointment of Lt. General Kamal Davar as the first Director General (DG). The DG reports to the Chief of Defence Staffs (CDS). It is supposed to be the nodal agency for all defence-related intelligence, thus distinguishing it from the RAW. Much of the agency's budget and operations are classified.

DIA has control of MoD's prized technical intelligence assets – the Directorate of Signals Intelligence and the Defence Image Processing and Analysis Centre (DIPAC). While the Signals Directorate is responsible for acquiring and decrypting enemy communications, the DIPAC controls India's satellite-based image acquisition capabilities. The DIA also controls the Defence Information Warfare Agency (DIWA) which handles all elements of the information warfare repertoire, including psychological operations, cyber-war, electronic intercepts and the monitoring of sound waves.Before the creation of the Defence Intelligence Agency, the military intelligence capability of India's armed forces was limited to Field Intelligence Units (FIU) and separate intelligence arms of the services. These distinct services were not able to effectively coordinate intelligence operations and sharing of information. The armed forces also heavily relied on civilian intelligence agencies such as the Research and Analysis Wing and the Intelligence Bureau. With wide-ranging resources and functions, the DIA will be superior to and coordinate the Directorate of Military Intelligence, Directorate of Air Intelligence and the Directorate of Naval Intelligence.

Signals Intelligence Directorate
The Signals Intelligence Directorate is a joint service organisation, manned by personnel from the Army, Navy and Air Force. It has a large number of WEUs (Wireless Experimental Units) that carry out the task of monitoring military links of other countries.

The Central Monitoring Organisation (CMO) is directly under the Ministry of Defence. It has several monitoring companies, located at different locations around the country. Task is to monitor the use of radio spectrum by all users, such as Defence, Police, AIR, Railways, PSUs etc.

Enforcement Directorate 

The Enforcement Directorate (ED) is an investigative agency that enforces economic laws and an economic intelligence agency. The agency is under the Department of Revenue, Ministry of Finance.

See also

 National Investigation Agency
 Central Monitoring System
 NETRA
 Law enforcement in India
 Mass surveillance in India
 Multi Agency Centre (India)
 NATGRID
 National Counter Terrorism Centre
 NIA Most Wanted
 Telecom Enforcement Resource and Monitoring
 Enforcement directorate

References

Further reading
 Military Intelligence in India: An Analysis Bhashyam Kasturi: The Indian Defence Review, 1997
 Cryptography Technology and Policy Directions in the Context of NII Gulshan Rai, R.K.Dubash, and A.K.Chakravarti. Information Technology Group Dept. of Electronics Govt. of India December, 1997

External links

 
India
India
Intelligence